Amirabad-e Bezanjan (also Romanized as Amīrābād-e Bezanjān; also known as Amīrābād-e Arazī) is a village in Baqerabad Rural District, in the Central District of Mahallat County, Markazi Province, Iran. At the 2006 census, its population was 72, in 21 families.

References 

Populated places in Mahallat County